Ernest Wright (born 1912, date of death unknown) was an English footballer who played as an inside forward in the 1930s.

After brief spells in the Football League with Queens Park Rangers (1 game) and Crewe Alexandra (4 games), Wright moved to Chesterfield, and made his debut for them in Division Two on 18 April 1938 against Bradford Park Avenue, although this was to be his only appearance for the club.

Wright then moved to Oldham Athletic making almost 40 league appearances up to World War II.

References 

1912 births
Year of death missing
Association football inside forwards
English Football League players
Queens Park Rangers F.C. players
Crewe Alexandra F.C. players
Chesterfield F.C. players
Oldham Athletic A.F.C. players
English footballers